This article contains the rank insignia of the Royal Hellenic Navy (until 1973).

Officer ranks 

1 The rank was instituted in 1939 for King George II, and was held only by his successors, King Paul and King Constantine II.

Other ranks

See also 
 Hellenic Navy
 Greek military ranks

References 

Bibliography
 

Military ranks of Greece
History of the Hellenic Navy